Deconstruction is the only album by the band of the same name, released in 1994. It was released by Rick Rubin's label American Recordings. It charted at number 31 on the Billboard Heatseekers album chart.

Critical reception
Critics gave the album largely mixed reviews, often while comparing Deconstruction to its predecessor Jane's Addiction. Trouser Press wrote that "while Deconstruction can claim a few decent songs and Dave Navarro’s dazzling guitar work, the album is ruined by utterly toneless vocals — both Navarro and bassist Eric Avery are credited, but whomever is doing the singing makes former bandmate Perry Farrell sound like Pavarotti." Exclaim! wrote: "Deconstruction is an ethereal and evolving affair, containing both Eric and Dave's stringed histrionics and ever-morphing jams, yet again lacks the edge of Jane's Addiction, and meanders when it should rock, almost to the point of being lackadaisical."

AllMusic considered the album to be an experiment bridging Jane's Addiction and whatever Avery and Navarro might do next, and concluded that the album is a "springboard for more, certainly, but not a final product." The most positive review came from PopMatters, which called the album "terribly underrated."

Track listing
 L.A. Song - 6:02
 Single - 6:45
 Get at 'Em - 4:29
 Iris - 4:40
 Dirge - 5:53
 Fire in the Hole - 5:52
 Son - 3:07
 Big Sur - 5:41
 Hope - 3:49
 One - 5:32
 America - 7:02
 Sleepyhead - 3:09
 Wait for History - 6:03
 That Is All - 1:10
 Kilo - 2:09

Personnel
 Eric Avery - bass, vocals
 Dave Navarro - guitars, vocals
 Michael Murphy - drums
 Gibby Haynes - vocals on "Get at 'Em" and "Fire in the Hole"

References

1994 albums
Deconstruction (band) albums